This is a list of gliders/sailplanes of the world, (this reference lists all gliders with references, where available) 
Note: Any aircraft can glide for a short time, but gliders are designed to glide for longer.

Bulgarian miscellaneous constructors 
 Bisser – Bulgaria
 DAR Zdravka Vekilski – 1926 parasol single-seat glider, Hermann Vinter, 1 built – named after Lt Vekilski, Bulgarian national hero
 DAR Rilski Orel – 1935 single-seat parasol training glider, span 15.82m – 3 built, 'Albatross', 'Chuchuliga' ('Lark') and 'Rilski Orel' ('Rilksi Eagle') – Rilski Orel won 1936 Olympic gold medal for flight qualities.
 DAR Zdravka Toprakchiev – 1926 parasol single-seat glider, Hermann Winter, 1 built – named after Mjr Toprakchiev, Bulgarian national hero
 Kometa Standard – L. Panov and D. Panchovsky
 Kometa-Standard II – L. Panov and D. Panchovsky
 Kometa-Standard III – L. Panov and D. Panchovsky
 Lazarov Drang (Лазаров Дрангов) – Lazarov, Tzvetan – Bulgaria
 Polkovnik Drangov – Lazarov, Zvetan – Bulgaria
 Jerav (glider) – Bulgaria (Kranich II copy)
 VSR Musachevo Jastreb

Notes

Further reading

External links

Lists of glider aircraft